Falstaff was a British sounding rocket used during the 1970s as part of the Chevaline programme to improve the penetrability  of the Polaris nuclear missile. It was the largest UK rocket with a solid booster ever launched.

Polaris
The Falstaff was part of the Chevaline programme to improve the Polaris programme. The Penetration Aids Carrier (PAC) was capable of maneuvering a Falstaff rocket and dispensing missiles. According to John Pitfield, the PAC was launched in 1969, 1975, 1976 and 1978.

Since the Australian government at the time was not in favour of nuclear weapons, the testing of the Falstaff vehicles on Australian soil had the potential to cause embarrassment. The details of over 4000 launches from the Woomera Range are still not fully released.

Before the revelation that the Falstaff rockets were part of a nuclear program, anti-nuclear campaigners in Australia had believed that testing ended in 1963.

Design
It delivered an average thrust of  during 37 seconds.

A launch on 1 October 1969 used the Stonechat Mk 1 booster.

Launches
The Falstaff was launched eight times between 1969 and 1979 at Woomera, Australia, seven of which were the Mk 2 variant. There was one failure, on 23 April 1978.

Commemoration
The Falstaff rocket was commemorated in an event cover that depicted a rocket recognisable as a Falstaff. 5 December 1978 was commemorated in such a way.

References

Experimental rockets
Space programme of the United Kingdom
Sounding rockets of the United Kingdom